Hubbard Township is a township in Polk County, Minnesota, United States. It is part of the Grand Forks-ND-MN Metropolitan Statistical Area. The population was 83 at the 2000 census.

Hubbard Township was organized in 1882, and named for Lucius Frederick Hubbard (1836–1913), ninth governor of Minnesota.

Geography

Demographics
As of the census of 2000, there were 83 people, 38 households, and 27 families living in the township. The population density was 2.0 people per square mile (0.8/km2). There were 43 housing units at an average density of 1.0/sq mi (0.4/km2). The racial makeup of the township was 98.80% White and 1.20% Native American.

There were 38 households, out of which 15.8% had children under the age of 18 living with them, 57.9% were married couples living together, 10.5% had a female householder with no husband present, and 28.9% were non-families. 28.9% of all households were made up of individuals, and 21.1% had someone living alone who was 65 years of age or older. The average household size was 2.18 and the average family size was 2.59.

In the township the population was spread out, with 16.9% under the age of 18, 4.8% from 18 to 24, 20.5% from 25 to 44, 27.7% from 45 to 64, and 30.1% who were 65 years of age or older. The median age was 50 years. For every 100 females, there were 97.6 males. For every 100 females age 18 and over, there were 97.1 males.

The median income for a household in the township was $43,438, and the median income for a family was $46,250. Males had a median income of $32,500 versus $28,750 for females. The per capita income for the township was $20,561. There were no families and 3.3% of the population living below the poverty line, including no under eighteens and none of those over 64.

See also
Hubbard Township, Hubbard County, Minnesota

References

Townships in Polk County, Minnesota
Townships in Minnesota